The Fiat (later Aeritalia) G.91Y is an Italian ground-attack and reconnaissance aircraft which first flew in 1966. Although resembling its predecessor, the Fiat G.91, the aircraft was in fact a complete redesign, a major difference with it being equipped with twin engines rather than the original single engine.

Design and development
The G.91Y was an increased-performance version of the Fiat G.91 funded by the Italian government. Based on the G.91T two-seat trainer variant, the single Bristol Orpheus turbojet engine of this aircraft was replaced by two afterburning General Electric J85 turbojets which increased thrust by 60% over the single-engined variant. Structural modifications to reduce airframe weight increased performance further and an additional fuel tank occupying the space of the G.91T's rear seat provided extra range. Combat manoeuvrability was improved with the addition of automatic leading edge slats.

The avionics equipment of the G.91Y was considerably upgraded with many of the American, British and Canadian systems being licence-manufactured in Italy.

Flight testing of three pre-production aircraft was successful, with one aircraft reaching a maximum speed of Mach 0.98. Airframe buffeting was noted and subsequently rectified in production aircraft by raising the position of the tailplane slightly.

Production
An initial order of 55 aircraft for the Italian Air Force was completed by Fiat in March 1971, by which time the company had changed its name to Aeritalia (from 1969, when Fiat aviazione merged with Aerfer). The order was increased to 75 aircraft with 67 eventually being delivered. In fact, the development of the new G.91Y was quite long, with the first order being for about 20 pre-series examples that followed the two prototypes. The first pre-series 'Yankee' (the nickname of the new aircraft) flew in July 1968.

AMI (Italian Air Force) placed orders for two batches; 35 fighters followed by another 20, later cut to 10. The last one was delivered around mid 1976, making a total of two prototypes, 20 pre-series and 45 series aircraft. No export success followed. These aircraft served with 101° Gruppo/8° Stormo (Cervia-S.Giorgio) from 1970, and later, from 1974, they served with the 13° Gruppo/32° Stormo (Brindisi). Those 'Gruppi' (Italian equivalent of British 'squadrons', usually equipped with 18 aircraft) lasted until the early '90s, as the only ones equipped with the 'Yankee', using them as attack/reconnaissance machines, both over ground and sea, until the AMX replaced them.

Variants
 G.91Y - Prototype and production aircraft.
 G.91YT - Projected two-seat trainer variant.
 G.91YS - Prototype with enhanced avionics and extra hardpoints to carry AIM-9 Sidewinder missiles for evaluation by Switzerland. First flown on 16 October 1970.

Operators
 
 Italian Air Force operated 65 Fiat G.91Ys until 1994

Aircraft on display
 A Fiat G.91Y is preserved and on public display at the Italian Air Force Museum, Vigna di Valle.
 A Fiat G.91Y is the gate guardian at the " Antonio Locatelli " High school in Bergamo, Italy.

Specifications (G.91Y)

See also

References

Notes

Bibliography

 Green, William. The Observer's Book of Aircraft. London. Frederick Warne & Co. Ltd., 1972.

External links

Flight, 1965 - Original advertisement preceding the first flight

G.091Y
1960s Italian fighter aircraft
1960s Italian attack aircraft
Low-wing aircraft
Aircraft first flown in 1966